Porky's Movie Mystery is a 1939 Warner Bros. Looney Tunes animated cartoon directed by Bob Clampett. The short was released on March 11, 1939, and stars Porky Pig. It is a parody of the Mr. Moto series.

Plot
A radio news report from Walter Windshield (a spoof of Walter Winchell) says that a mysterious phantom has been haunting Hollywood for weeks, ruining pictures and frightening stars.  At Warmer Bros Studios (a spoof of Warner Bros, the company that owns the Looney Tunes), the phantom is on his rampage.

Studio cops look all around the lot for the phantom. They even question famous movie monsters like Frankenstein, who's biting his fingernails as a cop grills him with questions.

Later, the phantom climbs a spiral staircase all the way to the ceiling, then slides back down the pole to the top floor. Then he sneaks into The Invisible Man's dressing room and reveals himself to be The Invisible Man himself. He then tells his audience that the reason he's been doing what he's doing is because he was fired after starring in one picture (presumably his self-titled picture based on the book). Then he tells his audience that he will crack every camera, wreck every reel, smash every set and scaring off every star away from Hollywood, and laughs.

Fed up with the phantom's wrath, the public and the police call upon Mr. Motto (Porky Pig) to stop him. Unfortunately, Mr. Motto is currently on vacation. The police chief doesn't care if Mr. Motto is on vacation and demands that they summon him.

Mr. Motto is on a tiny island reading a book about Ju Jitsu. He suddenly receives a phone call and answers the coconut. The caller tells Mr. Motto about the phantom and so he ends his vacation and flies off to Hollywood. He crash lands in the chief's office and greets the chief with a throw down. Mr. Motto apologizes and goes to work at once.

While Mr. Motto searches for the phantom, The Invisible Man phantom spots him, takes off his black attire and blends into a poster showing an actress named Lotta Dimples in a film called Great Guns. Mr. Motto came by, continues his search, and gets kicked by The Invisible Man. The Invisible Man then grabs an ax and attempts to kill Mr. Motto. The Invisible Man corners Mr. Motto at a wall but before he could finish him off, Mr. Motto read his book again, grabs the ax and attacks the phantom. Mr. Motto even puts the ax down. Mr. Motto punches the phantom, throws him around and finishes him off. Then as the reporter reports on what's about to happen, Mr. Motto grabs his anti-invisible juice and sprays it all over the phantom. The Invisible Man phantom is revealed to be Hugh Herbert.

Home media
Laserdisc - Guffaw and Order: Looney Tunes Fight Crime
DVD - Porky Pig 101

References

External links
 

1939 films
Looney Tunes shorts
Films directed by Bob Clampett
American black-and-white films
1930s American animated films
Porky Pig films
Films scored by Carl Stalling
1939 animated films